Flore Enyegue (born 9 July 1991) is a Cameroonian footballer who plays as a goalkeeper. She is a member of the Cameroon women's national football team. She was part of the team at the 2015 FIFA Women's World Cup. On club level she plays for AS Police in Cameroon.

References

1991 births
Living people
Cameroonian women's footballers
Cameroon women's international footballers
Place of birth missing (living people)
2015 FIFA Women's World Cup players
Women's association football goalkeepers